The Russian ironclad Sevastopol was ordered as a 58-gun wooden frigate by the Imperial Russian Navy in the early 1860s, but was converted while under construction into a 32-gun armored frigate. She served in the Baltic Fleet and was reclassified as a training ship in 1880. Sevastopol was decommissioned five years later, but was not sold for scrap until 1897.

Description
She displaced  and she was fitted with a blunt iron ram at her bow. Sevastopol was considered to be a good sea boat and her total crew numbered 607 officers and enlisted men.

The ship was fitted with a horizontal return-connecting-rod steam engine built by the Izhora Works of Saint Petersburg. It drove a single two-bladed propeller using steam that was provided by an unknown number of rectangular boilers. She was schooner-rigged with three masts.

As a heavy frigate, Sevastopol was intended to be armed with 54 of the most powerful guns available to the Russians, the  60-pounder smoothbore gun, and four long 36-pounder smoothbores. Her armament was revised when she was converted to an ironclad and she was completed with an armament of thirty-two 60-pounder guns, four on the upper deck as chase guns and 28 on the lower deck. In 1868, one chase gun and two guns on the lower deck were replaced by  rifled guns and 11 more of the 60-pounders were replaced by seven 8-inch guns two years later. In 1877, her armament was changed again to 14 eight-inch guns on the lower deck and two more on the upper deck. Also mounted on the upper deck were one  and ten  rifled guns.

Construction and service
Sevastopol, named for the Siege of Sevastopol during the Crimean War, was laid down on 7 September 1860 as a 58-gun heavy frigate at Kronstadt. She was reordered as (converted into) a 32-gun armored frigate on 26 July 1862 while still under construction. The ship was launched on 12 August 1864 and commissioned on 8 July 1865. In 1870, repairs to her stern were made by raising her at the stern using air bags. She served with the Baltic Fleet for her entire career and was reclassified as a training ship on 23 March 1880. Sevastopol was decommissioned on 15 June 1885 and sold for breaking up in May 1897.

Notes

Footnotes

References

 

Naval ships of Russia
Ironclad warships of the Imperial Russian Navy
1864 ships
Ships built in Saint Petersburg